Diazonaphthoquinone (DNQ) is a diazo derivative of naphthoquinone.  Upon exposure to light, DNQ converts to a derivative that is susceptible to etching. In this way, DNQ has become an important reagent in photoresist technology in the semiconductor industry.

Diazonaphthoquinone sulfonic acid esters are components of common photoresist materials.  Such photoresists are used in the manufacture of semiconductors. In this application DNQs are mixed with Novolac resin, a type of phenolic polymer. The DNQ functions as a dissolution inhibitor. During the masking/patterning process, portions of the photoresist film are exposed to light while others remain unexposed.  In the unexposed regions of the resist film, the DNQ acts as a dissolution inhibitor and the resist remains insoluble in the aqueous base developer.  In the exposed regions, the DNQ forms a ketene, which, in turn, reacts with ambient water to form a base soluble indene carboxylic acid.  The exposed regions of the photoresist film become soluble in aqueous base; thus allowing the formation of a relief image during development.

Chemical reactions
Upon photolysis, DNQ  undergoes a Wolff rearrangement to form a ketene.  The ketene adds water to form indane-carboxylic acid.

References

Diazo compounds